James Min (born 13 September 2000) is an Australian former figure skater. He is a two-time Australian national silver medalist (2016, 2019).

On the junior level, he is the 2015 Jégvirág Cup silver medalist, and a three-time Australian junior national champion (2014-2016).

He reached the free skate of the 2020 and 2022 Four Continents Championships.

Programs

Competitive highlights

References

External links 
 

Australian male single skaters
2000 births
Living people